Cəngan (also, Dzhangyan and Mugan’-Dzhangen) is a village and the least populous municipality in the Salyan Rayon of Azerbaijan.  It has a population of 348.

References 

Populated places in Salyan District (Azerbaijan)